The Polipoli Spring State Recreation Area is a state park of Hawaii in the United States. It is on the island of Maui about ten miles from Kula up the slope of Haleakalā.

It covers about 10 acres of the  Kula Forest Reserve. The high-elevation climate can be cold, with nighttime temperatures below freezing. The terrain is rough and use of a four-wheel drive vehicle is recommended.

There are four main trails. The Haleakalā Ridge Trail enters the recreation area. It features scrub, grassland, and forest habitat with cinder substrates. The adjacent Plum Trail is planted with plum and other trees. The Polipoli Trail, which starts within the recreation area, features various conifers. The Redwood Trail is used for mountain biking. Visitors can view redwoods and an old ranger's cabin.

The area was originally covered in dense forests of koa (Acacia koa), māmane (Sophora chrysophylla), and ʻōhiʻa lehua (Metrosideros polymorpha). When the park was established, it was devoid of trees and was subsequently reforested in the 1930s with pines, eucalyptus, tropical ash, cypress, China-fir, and coast redwood.

Activities in the park include off-roading, hiking, and hunting for wild boar and feral goats.

References

Protected areas of Maui
State parks of Hawaii